Dominical may refer to:
Dominical, Puntarenas, Costa Rica
Dominical, Chiriquí, Panama
Dominical letter
Dominical saying